DJ Miko was an Italian dance act fronted by keyboardist Monier Quartararo Gagliardo (born 8 February 1973) and British vocalist Louise Anne Gard from Tunbridge Wells. It mainly released dance cover versions of past pop and rock hits and is primarily known for its 1993 hit with a cover of 4 Non Blondes' "What's Up". During its active years, DJ Miko released one album and twelve singles.

The project was managed by the Milan-based record company Dig It International, for which Gagliardo already worked as an in-house producer, and released on its Hotline Records label. As with all other releases on Hotline Records, SAIFAM in Verona was responsible for the music production. Following the closure of Dig It International in 1997, the project was fully absorbed by SAIFAM.

DJ Miko has made many appearances on the Eurodance compilation album Dancemania series, specifically its sub-series albums including Dancemania Speed and Dancemania Covers since 1999, and on Konami's Bemani series of rhythm music video games with three covers.

Over its career, the DJ Miko project has employed various studio vocalists. Its debut single "What's Up" was recorded by singer Maria Caprì from Milan. The follow-up, "Rhythm", featured lead vocals by Annerley Gordon and background vocals by Cristina Dori. The singles "Clementine" (1997) through "Shout" (2000) were all sung by Jackie Bodiemead, a studio vocalist at SAIFAM. "Forever Young" (2001), the final single released on vinyl, was sung by Italian studio singer and vocal coach Melody Castellari. In recent years, SAIFAM has occasionally used the names of its successful projects from the past, including DJ Miko, as aliases for dance cover versions on its many compilation album series.

Discography

Singles

Albums 

 The Last Millennium (1999, Italy)

 "What's Up 2000" (The Ultimate Mix)
 "My Sharona"
 "Keep On" (BPM 140 Mix)
 "Sky High"
 "Superboy" (Factory Team Dance Mix)
 "Lovely Lullaby" (LP Version)
 "Radio Star"
 "Dreaming" (Original Mix)
 "Hot Stuff" (Factory Team Edit)
 "Clementine" (F.T. & Company Edit)
 "Rhythm"
 "What's Up" (Original Mix)

Video games
DJ Miko has a total of 2 cover songs which appear in the Dance Dance Revolution arcade series:
 "Sky High", originally by Jigsaw (cover also available in StepManiaX)
 "What a Wonderful World", originally by Louis Armstrong (cover credited to Beatbox vs. DJ Miko)

Additional appearances include the following:
 Dance Dance Revolution A20 golden cabinets received "Sky High (20th Anniversary Mix)" by Haruki Yamada (ATTIC INC.) with Martin Leroux on June 27, 2019. It is a cover of "Sky High" that is inspired by the DJ Miko version.
 Dance Maniax, known as Dance Freaks in South Korea, features "My Sharona" by DJ Miko. This song was originally by The Knack, and this cover is only available on the first release of the game.

References 

Italian electronic music groups
Italian house music groups
Italian Eurodance groups